The 2001 County Championship season, known as the CricInfo Championship for sponsorship reasons, was contested through two divisions: Division One and Division Two. Each team plays all the others in their division both home and away. The top three teams from Division Two were promoted to the first division for 2002, while the bottom three sides from Division 1 are relegated.

Teams

Division One
 Team promoted from Division Two

Division Two
 Team relegated from Division One

Standings
Teams receive 12 points for a win, 6 for a tie and 4 for a draw. Bonus points (a maximum of 5 batting points and 3 bowling points) may be scored during the first 130 overs of each team's first innings.

Division One

Division Two

Results

Division One

Division Two

Statistics

Division One

Most runs

Most wickets

Division Two

Most runs

Most wickets

See also
2001 Cheltenham & Gloucester Trophy
2001 Benson & Hedges Cup
2001 Norwich Union League

Notes

References

County Championship seasons
County Championship